The Red Branch (alternatively) is the name of two of the three royal houses of the king of Ulster,  Conchobar mac Nessa, at his capital Emain Macha (Navan Fort, near Armagh), in the Ulster Cycle of Irish mythology. In modern retellings it is sometimes used as the name of an order of warriors, the Red Branch Knights.

The names of two of Conchobar's houses can be translated as "Red Branch", as Old Irish had two words for "red": derg, bright red, the colour of fresh blood, flame or gold; and ruad, russet, used for the colour of red hair. The Cróeb Ruad (modern Irish Craobh Rua, "russet branch") was where the king sat; its name has survived as the townland of Creeveroe in County Armagh. The Cróeb Derg (modern Irish Craobh Dearg, "blood red branch") was where severed heads and other trophies of battle were kept. His third house was called the Téite Brec or "speckled hoard", where the heroes' weapons were stored.

Modern usage
The name Red Branch Knights was used by a loyalist paramilitary group from Northern Ireland in September 1992 to claim responsibility for incendiary devices and a blast bomb left in a Dublin-based bank in Newtownabbey. Statements were sent to the media threatening action against anyone with political or economic links with the Republic of Ireland. They are not known to have been responsible for any casualties during the Troubles.
A Belfast Celtic group also goes by the name Craobh Rua.
The name "Knights of the Red Branch" was also used by an Irish Catholic fraternal organization in Philadelphia, Pennsylvania and San Francisco, California in the 19th and early to mid 20th centuries.  The society was originally a patriotic and military organization in Ireland but functioned as a fraternal and beneficial society in America in the early 20th Century.

Notes

Ulster Cycle